The Royal Australian Naval Nursing Service (RANNS) was a former female branch of the Royal Australian Navy. The RANNS was formed in October 1942, wartime demands lead to a need to recruit women directly into the RAN. At its wartime peak the RANNS was made up of 56 nursing sisters with at least 12 months prior experience. The RANNS was disbanded 1948 but the demand for nurses was so great that the organisation was reformed in November 1948. In June 1984 the RANNS and the other female branch of the RAN, the Women's Royal Australian Naval Service, were incorporated into the permanent force and all female nurses became members of the nursing branch of the RAN.

References

Citations

Sources

See also 
 Australian women during World War II
 Women's Royal Australian Naval Service
 Royal Australian Air Force Nursing Service

All-female military units and formations
Naval
History of the Royal Australian Navy
Military nursing
Naval history of World War II
Naval medicine